Armorel High School is a comprehensive public high school serving students in grades seven through twelve in the distant, rural community of Armorel, Arkansas, United States. It is the one of seven public high schools located in Mississippi County, Arkansas and the only high school administered by Armorel School District.

A portion of Blytheville is zoned to Armorel High.

Academics 
This Title I school is accredited by the Arkansas Department of Education (ADE) with accreditation under advisement with AdvancED since 2004.

The assumed course of study follows the Smart Core curriculum developed the Arkansas Department of Education (ADE), which requires students to complete at least 22 credit units before graduation. Students engage in regular (core) and career focus courses and exams and may select Advanced Placement (AP) coursework and exams that may lead to college credit.

Athletics 
The Armorel High School mascot and athletic emblem is the Tiger with the school colors of black and orange.

The Armorel Tigers participate in various interscholastic activities in the 1A Classification—the state's smallest classification—within the 1A 3 East Conference administered by the Arkansas Activities Association. Armorel's athletic activities include basketball (boys/girls), cheer, golf (boys/girls), baseball, softball, and track and field (boys/girls). Additionally, in 2018-2019 Armorel will field its first-ever AAA varsity swimming team.

References

External links 
 

Public high schools in Arkansas
Schools in Mississippi County, Arkansas